A list of films made in Trinidad and Tobago:

External links
 Trinidad and Tobago films at the Internet Movie Database

References 

Trinidad
Films